Jovan Kastratović (born 22 January 1993) is a Serbian football forward who plays for Budućnost Konarevo

Club career
Born in Kraljevo, Kastratović started playing football with local academy "Junior" and later passed Borac Čačak youth categories. He noted his first senior appearances as a loaned player with Serbian League West side Polet Ljubić, where he played 8 league matches and scored 1 goal. He moved to Zemun in the winter break off-season 2012–13. Kastratović affirmed himself as a forward playing with Zemun, and he scored 9 goals on 30 matches playing for in the Serbian League Belgrade. He was related with Rad at the beginning of 2014, but also stayed with Zemun until the end of 2013–14 season. In summer 2014, Kastratović joined Borac Banja Luka, but missed the beginning of season due to administrative problems. On 1 April 2015 he joined Legionovia Legionowo, where he made 6 appearances until the end of 2014–15 season. Later, during 2015, he also played with Aluminij, where scored once time on 14 matches in the Slovenian Second League. In summer 2016, Kastratović joined Radnički Kovači, where he played in the first half of the 2016–17 season in Morava Zone League and was the best team scorer. During the winter break off-season, he moved to Sileks. Kastratović scored his first goal for new club in 3–2 victory against Bregalnica Štip on 30 April 2017. In summer 2017, Kastratović joined Sloga Kraljevo. At the beginning of 2018, he moved to Zlatibor Čajetina. While with Zlatibor, Kastratović scored 3 goals on 12 matches in the Serbian League West, including the last one in the final fixture of the season, in 2–0 victory over Karađorđe Topola, after which Zlatibor promoted to the Serbian First League. Following the end of season, Kastratović left the club and returned to Sloga Kraljevo. After forming the new competition named Šumadija-Raška Zone, Kastratović scored in opening fixture match, against Šumadija Toponica, on 25 August 2018.

Career statistics

Honours
Zlatibor Čajetina
Serbian League West: 2017–18

References

External links
 
 
 
 

1993 births
Living people
Sportspeople from Kraljevo
Association football forwards
Serbian footballers
FK Zemun players
FK Borac Banja Luka players
Legionovia Legionowo players
Serbian expatriate footballers
Serbian expatriate sportspeople in Poland
Expatriate footballers in Poland
Serbian expatriate sportspeople in Slovenia
Expatriate footballers in Slovenia
NK Aluminij players
Expatriate footballers in North Macedonia
Serbian expatriate sportspeople in North Macedonia
FK Sileks players
OFK Radnički Kovači players
FK Sloga Kraljevo players
FK Zlatibor Čajetina players